Robelto Hector (born 19 December 1967) is a Nevisian politician and former leader of the Nevis Reformation Party (NRP) and minister in Nevis cabinet. 

He was minister of communications, works, public utilities, posts, physical planning, natural resources and environment, agriculture, lands, housing, co-operatives and fisheries during the administration of Joseph Parry. He was formerly a member of the Nevis Island Assembly until he lost his seat of St Paul's in the 2017 election by 11 votes. He was elected party leader on 21 October 2018 at the NRP conference, succeeding Joseph Parry. Hector was succeeded in the party leadership by Janice Daniel-Hodge in September 2020.

Hector is an attorney operating his own law firm in Charlestown, Nevis.

References

Living people
1967 births
Place of birth missing (living people)
Nevis Reformation Party politicians
Saint Kitts and Nevis politicians
Saint Kitts and Nevis lawyers